Frederic S. Durbin is an American writer and novelist of fantasy and horror.  His first novel, Dragonfly, was published by Arkham House in 1999. It was nominated for an International Horror Guild Award for Best First Novel.

His second novel, The Star Shard, was published by Houghton Mifflin Harcourt in 2012.

A Green and Ancient Light (edited by Navah Wolfe) was published by Saga Press in 2016.

Biography
Frederic S. Durbin was born in Taylorville, Illinois.  He graduated from Taylorville High School and attended Concordia College where he graduated summa cum laude.  He taught English at Niigata University in Japan from 1989-2011.

Bibliography

Novels
  Dragonfly (Arkham House, 1999)
 The Star Shard (Houghton Mifflin Harcourt, 2012)
  A Green and Ancient Light (Saga Press, 2016)

Short fiction 
A more complete bibliography available here

References

External links

Year of birth missing (living people)
Living people
20th-century American male writers
20th-century American novelists
20th-century American short story writers
21st-century American male writers
21st-century American novelists
21st-century American short story writers
American fantasy writers
American horror writers
American male novelists
American male short story writers
The Magazine of Fantasy & Science Fiction people
People from Taylorville, Illinois